Abū Manṣūr Muḥammad ibn Aḥmad al-Azharī (282–370 AH/895–980 AD) or simply known as Abu Mansur al-Azhari, was an Arab lexicographer, philologist and grammarian of Arabic. a prominent philologist of his time, known for his talents and the transmitting of philological knowledge. His most important work is Tahdhib al-Lughat (The Concise Guide of Languages).

Biography 
Al-Azhari was born in the city of Herat in Khorasan, at the time controlled by the Samanid dynasty. He is known as al-Azhari after an ancestor whose name is Azhar and nothing is known about him. In his youth, al-Azhari travelled to the city of Baghdad, which was considered a center of science, the city was still under the Abbasid rule. Studying in Baghdad, he met the famous contemporary grammarian of the Abbasid court Ibn al-Sari al-Zajjaj (d. 923). According to Ibn Khallikan, Al-Azhari happened to also meet another leading grammarian at the time, Ibn Duraid. In his travels to acquire knowledge of the Arabic language, he left Baghdad to the city of Mecca. Around this time, the Qarmatians are causing havoc in Arabia after revolting against the Abbasids. In 924 AD, as al-Azhari was returning from Mecca back to Baghdad accompanied by a pilgrimage caravan on their way back from Hajj, they were attacked by the Qarmatians led by Abu Tahir al-Jannabi. Many of the pilgrims were slaughtered and their belongings stolen. Al-Azhari however was taken as a prisoner, living his next two years in captivity. While he lived among the Bedouin Qarmatians, he recorded in his book Tahdhib al-Lughat their way of living and learned their idioms and expressions. Al-Azhari died in his native city of Herat in the year 980 AD.

Works 

 Tahdhib al-Lughat (The Concise Guide of Languages)
 Gharib al-Alfaz (Rare Words)
 Kitab al-Tafsir (Book of Interpretation)

See also 

 List of pre-modern Arab scientists and scholars

References 

980 deaths
10th-century Arabs
10th-century lexicographers
10th-century philologists
10th-century people from the Abbasid Caliphate
Scholars from the Abbasid Caliphate
Arab grammarians
Arab linguists
Grammarians of Arabic
Historical linguists
Lexicographers of Arabic
Medieval grammarians of Arabic
People from Herat
895 births